Kurushima is a Japanese island in the Inland Sea forming part of the city of Imabari, Ehime Prefecture

Kurushima may also refer to:

People
 Hidesaburō Kurushima (1888-1970), a Japanese industrialist, writer and scouting leader
 Kurushima Kinai (died 1757), a Japanese mathematician in the Edo period; also known as Kurushima Yoshita and Kurushima Yoshihiro
 Kurushima Michifusa (1562-1597), a Japanese samurai of the late Sengoku period
 Kurushima Takehiko (1874-1960), an author known as "the Japanese Hans Christian Andersen"

Other uses
 Kurushima I, a Japanese ferry, built in 1969 and later 
 Kurushima Kaikyō Bridge connects the island of Ōshima to the main part of Shikoku in Japan
 140038 Kurushima, a minor planet

Japanese-language surnames